St. Michael and All Angels Episcopal Church may refer to:

 St. Michael and All Angels Episcopal Church (Anniston, Alabama)
 St. Michael and All Angels Episcopal Church (Cincinnati, OH)
 St. Michael and All Angels Episcopal Church (Dallas, Texas)
 St. Michael and All Angels Episcopal Church (Denver, Colorado)